The Yunus Bey Mosque (from ) was an Ottoman-era mosque in the town of Komotini, Western Thrace, in Greece. Today only ruins remain of it.

Description 
The former mosque was built in what is now the Nea Mosynoupoli district of Komotini. It is located fifty metres east of the Poşpoş Tekke. It was built following the Ottoman conquest of Thrace, but the exact year Yunus Bey was erected remains unknown. Today, only its four outer walls and a door survive. The mosque's roof and all inner walls have collapsed. The interior is now used as a playground by local children.

In accordance with the expropriation plans of the municipality of Komotini, an estimated 41,25 m² of land of the plot of Yunus Bey is to be expropriated. This is based on the Komotini city plans that were drawn in 1993, which included several other mosques and masjids.

See also 
 Islam in Greece
 List of former mosques in Greece
 Yeni Mosque, Komotini

References

Bibliography

External links 

Ottoman mosques in Greece
Commons category link is on Wikidata
Buildings and structures in Komotini
Former mosques in Greece
Ruins in Greece
Ottoman Thrace